Cecil Ashby (1896 – 10 June 1929 in Douglas, Isle of Man) was a British motorcycle racer.
He won the European motorcycle championship twice. Ashby died in an accident during the 1929 Isle of Man Junior Tourist Trophy races.

References 

British motorcycle racers
Isle of Man TT riders
Motorcycle racers who died while racing
1896 births
1929 deaths